Druvciems is a residential area and neighbourhood of the city Jūrmala, Latvia.

References

External links

Neighbourhoods in Jūrmala